Sreelakshmi Suresh (Hindi: श्रीलक्ष्मी सुरेश; Malayalam : ശ്രീലക്ഷ്മി സുരേഷ്) born in 1998  is a web designer from Kozhikode, Kerala, India. She is mainly known for her work designing websites in India which gained her media coverage as early as 2006. Sources have named other individuals as holding the titles of World's Youngest CEO and World's Youngest Web Designer.

Early life
According to her father, Suresh Menon (lawyer, Calicut Bar Council) and mother Viju Suresh, she started using computers at the age of 3. She was designing by the age of 4 and had designed a website by 6. Sreelakshmi Suresh attends Presentation High Secondary School and designed her school's website, which was inaugurated by Binoy Viswam, Forest Minister, Government of Kerala, on 15 January 2007. Her own startup, eDesign launched in 2009.

Youngest title
The title of World's Youngest CEO and World's Youngest Web Designer has been liberally assigned to a number of individuals by various news media and sources. Some media have named Harli Jordean the "World's Youngest CEO" at age 8 and other sources, including the Press Information Bureau, have named Ajay Puri as the "World's Youngest Web Designer".

Awards
Sreelakshmi Suresh  is the recipient of multiple awards and other recognition. She was honoured by the Ministry of Women and Child Development (India), by conferring her the National Child Award for Exceptional Achievement in 2008. The award was presented to her by Sonia Gandhi in a function held at Vigyan Bhavan, New Delhi on 5 January 2009. She has also won the Golden Web Award (U.S.A), Sixty Plus Education Award (Canada), Feeblemind's Award of Excellence (UK), Webmasters Ink Award (U.S.A.) and Penmarric Bronze Award (Canada). Other awards include Global Internet Directories Gold Award (USA), WM8C Stamp of Excellence Award (USA), 37th Texa's Web Award (USA), American Association of Webmasters Merit Award, Thomas Sims Greves Award of Excellence (UK), Moms Global Award for inspirational Website 2006-07 (UK), ProFish-N-Sea Charters World Class Website Award (Brazil), Wadeshi Science Movement Excellence Award 2007 (India) among others.

She has been profiled in several publications for her awards and companies, TinyLogo and eDesign. The launches of some of her website have been covered by the regular media.

See also
 Suhas Gopinath

References

Businesspeople from Kozhikode
Malayali people
1998 births
Living people
Web designers
Businesswomen from Kerala
Indian computer programmers
Indian child businesspeople
21st-century Indian businesswomen
21st-century Indian businesspeople